Burrinjuckia   is an ichnogenus of bioclaustrations (a type of trace fossil). Burrinjuckia  includes outgrowths of the brachiopod's secondary shell
with a hollow interior in the mantle cavity of a brachiopod. Burrinjuckia  was probably a parasite. They have a stratigraphic range from the Late Ordovician to the Devonian.
The earliest Burrinjuckia  species B. clitambonitofilia Vinn, Wilson and Toom, 2014 occurs in brachiopod Clitambonites squamatus from the Late Ordovician oilshale of Estonia.

References

Trace fossils
Ordovician animals
Devonian animals
Brachiopod taxonomy
Paleozoology
Parasitism
Parasitology
Fossil taxa described in 1975